Steep Canyon Rangers is an American bluegrass band based in Asheville and Brevard, North Carolina. Though formed in 2000, the band has become widely known since 2009 for collaborating with actor/banjoist Steve Martin. In 2013, the Steep Canyon Rangers' solo album Nobody Knows You won the Grammy Award for Best Bluegrass Album. The previous year, their 2012 collaboration with Steve Martin, Rare Bird Alert, was nominated for the same award. Steep Canyon Rangers have recorded 9 solo albums plus two collaborative albums with Steve Martin. SCR performed as a quintet for nearly a decade before intermittent touring began as a sextet with Steve Martin; the band still performs in both configurations. In May 2013, Steve Martin and SCR began performing with Edie Brickell after she and Martin co-wrote and recorded Love Has Come for You.

Personnel

Current members

 Graham Sharp – banjo, electric banjo, harmonica, lead & harmony vocals (2000–present)
 Mike Guggino – mandolin, mandola, harmony vocals, (2000–present)
 Nicky Sanders – fiddle, harmony vocals (2004–present)
 Mike Ashworth – drums, box kit, cajón, dobro, harmony vocals (2013–present)
 Barrett Smith - upright bass, harmony vocals (2018–present)

Former members
 Woody Platt – lead vocals, guitar (2000-2022) 
 Lizzie Hamilton – fiddle, vocals (2000-2003)
 Charles Humphrey III – upright bass (2000-2017)

Early years
Steep Canyon Rangers formed in 2000 while students at the University of North Carolina in Chapel Hill.  The core group consisted of Woody Platt (guitar), Graham Sharp (banjo) and Charles R. Humphrey III (upright bass).  Early on, Platt's childhood friend, Mike Guggino (mandolin), was asked to join.  With original fiddler, Lizzie Hamilton, completing the quintet, Steep Canyon Rangers garnered fans across the U.S. performing festivals from North Carolina to Colorado.  Two albums of original music were recorded with the early lineup: Old Dreams and New Dreams and Mr. Taylor's New Home.  In 2001, the Rangers took first prize in Lyons, CO at the Rockygrass Festival band competition earning the Rangers a main stage performance the following year.  Hamilton left the group in 2003 but heavy touring continued with a rotation of fiddlers leading up to the eponymous CD Steep Canyon Rangers (released 2004) on Rebel Records.  The album contained a dozen more original songs and featured guest fiddlers including Josh Goforth.

Fiddle commitment
In 2004, Nicky Sanders approached the band for the position of full-time fiddle player and subsequently joined in July. The Rangers recorded their fourth album, One Dime at a Time in 2005 with producer Mike Bub (Del McCoury Band).  The next year the band won Emerging Artist of the Year at the International Bluegrass Music Association Awards ceremony.  Following the release of their fifth album in 2007, the band received two more IBMA nominations for Best Album (Lovin' Pretty Women) and Gospel Performance of the Year ("Be Still Moses"). In 2010, Sanders's fiddle tune "Mourning Dove" was nominated for IBMA Instrumental Song of the Year.

With Steve Martin

In May 2009, Steep Canyon Rangers were asked by banjoist/comedian Steve Martin to perform with him (as a sextet) in a benefit concert for the Los Angeles Public Library: featuring banjo and comedy.  This first collaborative performance took place at Club Nokia in Los Angeles, CA and was met with much acclaim.  Martin subsequently asked the Rangers to accompany him on a "world bluegrass tour" taking the group to venues such as Carnegie Hall (New York), Royal Festival Hall (London) and the Wang Center in Boston.  While in England, the group also performed on the critically acclaimed music TV show, Later with Jools Holland.  On June 27, 2009, Steve Martin and SCR were featured on a broadcast of A Prairie Home Companion.  Soon after, Martin played with the band at the Hardly Strictly Bluegrass festival in San Francisco. and Benaroya Hall in Seattle.  Martin appeared with the Steep Canyon Rangers at the 2010 Bonnaroo Music Festival and then on Austin City Limits on November 6, 2010.  On July 4, 2011, Martin and SCR performed A Capitol Fourth celebration on the West Lawn of the US Capitol Building.

In the summer of 2010, Steve Martin and SCR recorded their first collaborative album, Rare Bird Alert at Echo Mountain Recording in Asheville, NC.  The album contained tracks primarily composed by Martin and featured guest vocal appearances by Paul McCartney and the Dixie Chicks.  The CD was released the following March, and then on September 29, 2011, Martin and the Rangers were jointly named Entertainers of the Year at the IBMA Awards ceremony in Nashville, TN.  In May 2012, Martin and the Rangers played at the fifth annual DelFest as a headlining act.

In September 2017 Steep Canyon Rangers released The Long-Awaited Album with Steve Martin. A few months later, Out in the Open was released on January 26, 2018, but without Steve Martin in the band.

Continued touring
In 2011, Steep Canyon Rangers signed with Rounder Records with lead singer Woody Platt saying "[the Rangers] are honored to join Rounder Records and be a part of such a rich musical history." The band has recorded three records on the label as well as two collaborations with Steve Martin. A percussionist, Michael Ashworth, was added to the tour in 2013 and subsequently joined the Rangers as full-time member in the fall; Ashworth's performances feature a signature "box kit" consisting of multiple cajóns mixed with standard and modified drum hardware; it is sometimes referred to as a "cajón drum kit".

In 2013, the Steep Canyon Rangers' solo album Nobody Knows You won the Grammy Award for Best Bluegrass Album.
The previous year, their 2012 collaboration with Steve Martin, Rare Bird Alert, was nominated for the same award.

Personnel changes
On December 1, 2017, Charles Humphrey III (bass) announced that he was leaving the band to "pursue other musical and non-musical passions aside from Steep Canyon Rangers". Humphrey now tours with Songs from the Road Band. 

In January 2018, Barrett Smith joined Steep Canyon Rangers performing bass and vocals.

In April 2022, founding band member and frontman Woody Platt announced his departure from SCR to spend more time with family.

Discography

Albums

Singles
"Me and Paul Revere" (Steve Martin and Steep Canyon Rangers) (2011)
"Pretty Little One" (Steve Martin and Steep Canyon Rangers featuring Edie Brickell) (2014)
"Test Of Time" (Duet with Steep Canyon Rangers and Edie Brickell) (2015)
"California" (Steve Martin and Steep Canyon Rangers) (2020)

Music videos

References

External links

Nashville Review Interview with Steep Canyon Rangers

2000 establishments in North Carolina
American bluegrass music groups
Musical groups established in 2000
Musical groups from Asheville, North Carolina
Musical groups from North Carolina